Sir Stephen Olver  (16 June 1916 – 22 June 2011) was a British diplomat who was High Commissioner to Sierra Leone and Cyprus.

Career

Stephen John Linley Olver was educated at Stowe School and the University of Munich. He served with the (pre-independence) Indian Police Service 1935–44 and then with the Indian Political Service in Delhi, Quetta, Sikkim and Bahrain, 1944–47. When Pakistan became independent in August 1947 Olver continued to serve the Pakistan Foreign Service in Karachi until 1950 when he transferred to the British Foreign Service. He served in Berlin, Bangkok, Washington, D.C. and The Hague before being appointed High Commissioner to Sierra Leone in 1969. His last appointment was High Commissioner to Cyprus 1973–75.

Stephen Olver was appointed MBE in the New Year Honours of 1948 and CMG in the New Year Honours of 1965. He was knighted KBE shortly before his retirement, in the New Year Honours of 1975.

Offices held

References
OLVER, Sir Stephen (John Linley), Who Was Who, A & C Black, 1920–2008; online edn, Oxford University Press, Dec 2011; retrieved 22 May 2012
Sir Stephen Olver (obituary), The Times, London, 29 July 2011, page 47

1916 births
2011 deaths
People educated at Stowe School
Ludwig Maximilian University of Munich alumni
Indian Police Service officers in British India
High Commissioners of the United Kingdom to Sierra Leone
High Commissioners of the United Kingdom to Cyprus
Knights Commander of the Order of the British Empire
Companions of the Order of St Michael and St George
Indian Political Service officers
Members of HM Diplomatic Service
Pakistani diplomats